The Packet Radio Network (PRNET) was a set of early, experimental mobile ad hoc networks whose technologies evolved over time. It was funded by the Advanced Research Projects Agency (ARPA). Major participants in the project included BBN Technologies, Hazeltine Corporation, Rockwell International's Collins division, and SRI International.

History
ARPA initiated the PRNET project in 1973, funding both theoretical and experimental research. Its goals were outlined in a 1975 paper by Bob Kahn, namely, to investigate the feasibility of using packet-switched, store-and-forward radio communications to provide reliable computer communications in a mobile environment. The earlier ALOHAnet served as an inspiration, but PRNET tackled a significantly harder set of problems, namely, multi-hop communications between mobile vehicles without a central station. In Kahn's initial conception, the overall system design was "predicated upon the existence of an array of low cost repeaters", where he defines the term to mean "a particular kind of packet radio which is equipped to retransmit by radio some or all packets which it receives by radio". In today's terminology, this might be called a router or a packet switch, rather than a radio repeater.

The first PRNET was established under the auspices of SRI in the San Francisco Bay Area, with BBN contributing network technology and Collins creating the Experimental Packet Radios (EPRs), which implemented L-band spread-spectrum waveforms and supported half-duplex communications at 100 or 400 kilobits/second. There was also a smaller network at BBN, for software development and testing. The first packet radios were delivered in mid-1975 for initial testing and a quasi-operational network capability was established for the first time in September 1976, shortly after the prototype networking software was developed. By 1977, this software included radio network routing control; a gateway to other networks; network measurement; debugging tools; and configuration tools.

PRNET was sufficiently advanced by 1977 to participate in the initial three-way internetworking demonstration, which linked a mobile vehicle in PRNET with nodes in the ARPANET, and via SATNET, to nodes in London run by Peter Kirstein's research group at University College London. Afterwards, it was usually attached to the ARPANET so that BBN software developers could access and update it from Cambridge. By June 1978, about 25 radio nodes were available.

By September 1979, "Ron [Kunzelman] reported that SRI is now operating two PRNETs in the San Francisco bay area, and one PRNET at Ft. Bragg, North Carolina. The net at Ft. Bragg is now eight terminals on two TIUs, and will grow to forty terminals."

The Experimental Packet Radios were later replaced by Upgraded Packet Radios (UPR), circa 1978, and in 1986 by Low-Cost Packet Radio (LPR) as part of DARPA's follow-on SURAN project.

See also 

 History of the Internet

References 

 Robert E. Kahn, "The organization of computer resources into a packet radio network", AFIPS '75 Proceedings, May 19–22, 1975, pages 177-186.
 J. Burchfiel, R. Tomlinson and M. Beeler, "Functions and Structure of a Packet Radio Station," AFIPS Conference Proceedings, Volume 44, 1975, AFIPS Press, Montvale, N.J.
 Darryl E. Rubin, "Army Packet Radio Network Protocol Study", SRI International, November 1977.
 Robert E. Kahn, Steven A. Gronemeyer, Jerry Burchfiel, Ronald C. Kunzelman, "Advances in Packet Radio Technology", Proceedings of the IEEE, vol. 66, no. 11, November 1978, pages 1468–1498.
 
 J. Jubin, "Current packet radio network protocols", lNFOCOM‘85 Proc., Mar. 1985.
 J. Westcott and J. Jubin, "A distributed routing design for a broadcast environment," in MILCOM’82 Proc., 1982.
 John Jubin and Janet D. Tornow, "The DARPA Packet Radio Network Protocols", Proceedings of the IEEE, vol. 75, no. 1, January 1987, pages 21–32.

Packet radio